Bjarni Harðarson (born 25 December 1961 in Arnýjarhús, Hveragerði) is a bookseller, novelist, and former MP from the Icelandic Progressive Party.

Election and resignation
Bjarni was elected to parliament in 2007 as the eighth MP from the South Constituency. On November 10, 2008, he was involved in a political scandal; when he mistakenly leaked a document of his that contained strong criticism of Valgerður Sverrisdóttir, vice chairman of the Progressive Party, by emailing it to the press. The day after, Bjarni resigned from parliament.

2009 election
In the 2009 election, Bjarni ran as a candidate for the L-List of Sovereignty Supporters. He did not win a seat in the Althing; his previous constituency was taken by Margrét Tryggvadóttir.

Literary activities

Bjarni and his wife Elín Gunnlaugsdóttir (composer and poet) run Bókakaffið (https://www.bokakaffid.is/), a legendary bookshop in Selfoss which opened on October 6, 2006, and an outlet with the same name in Ármúli in Reykjavík. The two shops specialise in the sale of new and used books. The ever-growing publishing arm of Bókakaffið is Sæmundur (formerly Sunnlenska bókaútgáfan), boasting of a catalogue of more than 200 books.

Bjarni has published numerous novels, including:

 Mörður (Selfoss: Sæmundur, 2014), 
 Mensalder (Selfoss: Sæmundur, 2012), ; 9935901491
 Sigurðar saga fóts: Íslensk riddarasaga (Selfoss: Sæmundur, 2010), ; 9789935901439
 Svo skal dansa: skáldsaga úr veruleikanum (Reykjavík: Veröld, 2009), ; 9979789565

He has also published on folklore, and a collection of articles:

 Farsældar Frón: greinasafn Bjarna Harðarsonar (Selfoss: Sunnlenska bókaútgáfan, 2008) ; 997996037X.
 Landið, fólkið og þjóðtrúin: kortlagðir álagablettir og byggðir trölla, álfa, drauga, skrímsla og útilegumanna í Árnesþingi (Selfoss: Sunnlenska bókaútgáfan, 2001), ; 9789979607021.
Bjarni likes to write while abroad, drafting Sigurðar saga fóts in Ethiopia, writing Mensalder largely in a five-week period in Pakistan, and writing Mörður in Senegal.

See also 

 List of Icelandic writers
 Icelandic literature

References

External links 
 Bloggsíða Bjarna
 Kosningabaráttusíða Bjarna
 Tölvupóstar frá Bjarna Harðarsyni frétt RÚV 10. nóvember 2008

Bjarni Hardarson
Living people
1961 births
Bjarni Hardarson
Bjarni Hardarson
Bjarni Hardarson
Bjarni Hardarson